Negro Butte is a summit in San Bernardino County, California, in the United States.

History
The name was likely selected to honor a black miner of the California Gold Rush.

References

Mountains of San Bernardino County, California